Rostherne is a civil parish in Cheshire East, England. It contains nine buildings that are recorded in the National Heritage List for England as designated listed buildings.  Of these, one is listed at Grade I, the highest grade, and the others are at Grade II.  Apart from the settlement of Rostherne, the parish is rural.  The listed buildings consist of houses and cottages, a lodge, and a church with a tomb and sundial in the churchyard.

Key

Buildings

References

Citations

Sources

Listed buildings in the Borough of Cheshire East
Lists of listed buildings in Cheshire